Karl-Erik "Ecke" Bruneflod (24 March 1918 – 14 April 2008) was a Swedish curler., a 1979 Swedish men's curling champion and a two-time Swedish mixed curling champion (1969, 1974).

In 1970 he was inducted into the Swedish Curling Hall of Fame.

He worked for Swedish Curling Association as a chairman (1978–1982) and as a board member (1967–1978).

Teams

Men's

Mixed

Personal life
His son is Swedish curler Ken Bruneflod.

References

External links
 

1918 births
2008 deaths
Swedish male curlers
Swedish curling champions